

General managers

Owners

See also
List of Cleveland Guardians managers
Cleveland Guardians all-time roster
Cleveland Guardians award winners and league leaders
Cleveland Guardians team records
Cleveland Guardians seasons

References

Cleveland Guardians: History: All-Time General Managers. Accessed 2007-05-01.
Cleveland Guardians: History: All-Time Owners. Accessed 2007-05-01.

 
 
Cleveland Indians
Owners and executives